Eugene M. Lamb (March 7, 1910–December 1, 1982) was an American, Democratic politician.

Born in Sheboygan County, Wisconsin, Lamb studied business and accounting, and worked at Allis-Chalmers Manufacturing Company. He served in the Wisconsin State Assembly in 1949, 1951, and 1953. He was a Democrat. Lamb served as Wisconsin State Treasurer 1959–1961.

Notes

People from Sheboygan County, Wisconsin
State treasurers of Wisconsin
1910 births
1982 deaths
20th-century American politicians
Democratic Party members of the Wisconsin State Assembly